Robert Tyrell "T. J" Cummings Jr. (born August 31, 1981) is an American former basketball player. He is the son of former NBA player Terry Cummings and graduate of Homewood-Flossmoor High School. Cummings played college basketball with the UCLA Bruins for four years.  Upon graduation, he was drafted in the 2005 NBDL draft by the Albuquerque Thunderbirds in the 3rd round. In his rookie year, he averaged 12.6 points per game and 6.4 rebounds per game. On April 22, Albuquerque won the NBDL Championship against the Fort Worth Flyers 119–108.

In the 2006–2007 season, Cummings was waived by the Thunderbirds, but was signed by the Los Angeles D-Fenders.

High School Special Event Stats

|-
| style="text-align:left;"| 2000
| style="text-align:left;"| Nike Hoop Summit
| 1 ||   || 4.00 || 1.000 || .000 || .000|| 1.00 ||0.00  || 0.00 || 0.00 || 1.00
|-

College statistics

|-
| style="text-align:left;"| 2000–01
| style="text-align:left;"| UCLA
|32 ||6  ||  ||.485 ||.000  || .652 ||3.5  ||0.4 || 0.2 ||0.4  ||6.4
|-
| style="text-align:left;"| 2001–02
| style="text-align:left;"| UCLA
|33 || 1 || 17.5 ||.510 || .250 ||.745|| 3.1 ||0.5 || 0.2 || 0.2 || 7.6
|-
| style="text-align:left;"| 2002–03
| style="text-align:left;"| UCLA
|29  || 16 || 23.4 ||.455 ||.111  ||.812||4.93  ||0.66 || 0.28 || 0.41 || 10.34
|-
| style="text-align:left;"| 2003–04 
| style="text-align:left;"| UCLA
| 24 || 22 || 29.7 || .552 || .350 || .863|| 6.71 ||  1.17|| 0.12 || 0.21 || 12.79
|-
| style="text-align:left;"| 2004–05
| style="text-align:left;"| UCLA
| ||  ||  || ||  ||||  || ||  ||  || 
|-
|- class="sortbottom"
! style="text-align:center;" colspan=2|  Career

!118 ||46 || 22.9 ||.500 || .250 ||.766  || 4.4 ||0.7  || 0.2 ||0.3  || 9.0
|-

NCAA Awards & Honors
Pac-12 All-Freshman Team – 2001

Career statistics 

|-
| align="left" |  2008–09
| align="left" |Anaheim
| 3 || 3 || 24.4 || .417 || .000 || 1.000 || 3.33 || 0.00 || 1.33 || 0.00 || 10.00
|-
| align="left" |  2008–09
| align="left" | Liege
| 5 ||  || 13.8 || .333 || .500 || .750 || 2.2 || 0.2 || 0.0 || 0.0 || 4.8
|-
| align="left" |  2009–10
| align="left" | Springf/Maine
| 39 || 23 || 27.0 || .464 || .000 || .708 || 6.64 || 0.97 || 0.36 || 0.31 || 11.62
|-
| align="left" |  2010–11
| align="left" | Changwon
| 47 ||  || 10.9 || .529 || .000 || .755 || 3.0 || 0.2 || 0.4 || 0.3 || 6.3
|-
| align="left" |  2011–12
| align="left" | Oita
| 52 || 52 || 31.6 || .485 || .190 || .707 || 9.7 || 1.3 || 0.9 || 0.7 || 21.1
|-
| align="left" |  2012–13
| align="left" | Akita
| 12 ||  || 28.9 || .412 || .000 || .721 || 7.7 || 1.7 ||0.7 || 0.4 || 19.3
|-
| align="left" |  2012–13
| align="left" | Sendai
| 36 ||  || 33.5 || .464 || .250 || .685 || 8.3 || 1.7 || 0.5 || 0.2 || 23.1
|-
| align="left" |  2013–14
| align="left" | Shimane
| 32 ||  || 27.6 || .463 || .125 || .659 || 6.6 || 1.0 || 0.5 || 0.5 || 14.0
|-

References

External links
 TJ Cummings NBA D-League profile
 TJ Cummings NBA D-League stats at basketball-reference.com

1981 births
Living people
African-American basketball players
Albuquerque Thunderbirds players
American expatriate basketball people in Japan
Anyang KGC players
Basketball players from Illinois
Changwon LG Sakers players
Ehime Orange Vikings players
Liaoning Flying Leopards players
Los Angeles D-Fenders players
Maine Red Claws players
Power forwards (basketball)
Sendai 89ers players
Small forwards
Springfield Armor players
UCLA Bruins men's basketball players
Akita Northern Happinets players
People from Homewood, Illinois
American men's basketball players
Homewood-Flossmoor High School alumni
21st-century African-American sportspeople
20th-century African-American people